The articular bone is part of the lower jaw of most vertebrates, including most jawed fish, amphibians, birds and various kinds of reptiles, as well as ancestral mammals.

Anatomy 
In most vertebrates, the articular bone is connected to two other lower jaw bones, the suprangular and the angular. Developmentally, it originates from the embryonic mandibular cartilage. The most caudal portion of the mandibular cartilage ossifies to form the articular bone, while the remainder of the mandibular cartilage either remains cartilaginous or disappears.

In snakes 
In snakes, the articular, surangular, and prearticular bones have fused to form the compound bone. The mandible is suspended from the quadrate bone and articulates at this compound bone.

Function

In amphibians and reptiles 
In most tetrapods, the articular bone forms the lower portion of the jaw joint. The upper jaw articulates at the quadrate bone.

In mammals 
In mammals, the articular bone evolves to form the malleus, one of the mammalian ossicles of the middle ear. This is an apomorphy of the mammalian clade, and is used to determine the fossil transition to mammals. It is analogous to, but not homologous to the articular process of the lower jaw.

After the loss of the quadrate-articular joint, the squamosal and dentary bones form the new jaw joint in mammals.

See also 
 Evolution of mammalian auditory ossicles

References

Skeletal system
Vertebrate anatomy